Chip Fields, sometimes credited as Chip Hurd or Chip Fields-Hurd, is an American singer, actress, television director, and producer who has appeared in popular films, television shows, and Broadway theatre. She is best known for portraying Lynetta Gordon, the abusive birth mother of Penny Gordon Woods (played by Janet Jackson) in a four–part episode (1977) of the 1970s sitcom Good Times.

Career
Fields began her career as a singer. She joined Ronnie Spector as a Ronette in 1973 and recorded two singles for Buddah Records.

Fields began her acting career as an extra in the 1974 film Claudine. She has had numerous supporting roles and guest appearances on television. She played an unwed mother opposite Patty Weaver in the NBC television soap opera, Days of Our Lives. Also during the 1970s, she played the abusive birth mother of Millicent "Penny" Gordon Woods (Janet Jackson) on the sitcom Good Times.

From 1978 to 1979, she played Rita Conway in the short-lived The Amazing Spider-Man TV series. Rita Conway was J. Jonah Jameson's secretary, the same function as the African-American Glory Grant from the 1970s comics. She also appeared in What's Happening!!, Hill Street Blues, T. J. Hooker, Roc, Kirk (a short-lived sitcom starring Kirk Cameron), The Wayans Bros., and The Parkers. She played the role of "Laverne", mother to the character "Regine" on Living Single. 

Fields was a consultant for The Parkers, Zenon: Girl of the 21st Century, Living Single, and was a dialogue coach for the film, Menace II Society. She also directed episodes of the popular UPN sitcoms, One on One, All of Us, Girlfriends, The Parkers, as well as episodes of Romeo!, Just Jordan, Hannah Montana, Tyler Perry's House of Payne and Meet the Browns.Personal life
 
Chip is the mother of actress Kim Fields (famous for her roles on The Facts of Life and Living Single) and Alexis Fields (famous for her roles on Kenan & Kel, Moesha and Sister, Sister''). Chip has been married to technical director Ervin Hurd since August 20, 1994.

Discography

 1973 (as Ronnie and the Ronettes) – "Go Out and Get It" b/w "Lover, Lover" (Buddha 384)
 1974 (as Ronnie Spector and the Ronettes) – "I Wish I Never Saw the Sunshine" b/w "I Wonder What He's Doing" (Buddha 408)

Filmography

Acting

Film

Television

Production

Film

Television

References

External links
 
 

1951 births
Living people
Actresses from New York City
African-American television directors
American television directors
American film actresses
American stage actresses
American television actresses
American women television directors
African-American actresses
The Ronettes members
20th-century African-American women singers
21st-century African-American people
21st-century African-American women